Tammiku is a village in Põltsamaa Parish, Jõgeva County in Estonia.

References

Villages in Jõgeva County